is a Japanese musical composer, guitarist and music producer under Sony Music Entertainment. He is member of band Tube, began his solo actions around that same time. Since 1992 he has been composing songs for few Being Inc. artist such as Mai Kuraki and Zard. Michiya was given his own Signature Model Stratocaster from Fender in 2002., His song "Jaguar '08" was named the 31st best guitar instrumental by Young Guitar Magazine in 2019.

Albums (soloworks, instrumental) 
DRIVIN'　（1986）
Smile on Me (1988)
GUITAR LAND　（1990）
DREAM BOX　（1991）
Moon　（1992）
Real Time　（1993）
J'S THEME (1993)
Color of Life　（1995）
RED BIRD　（2000）
Best Works 1987-2008 ~route86~ (2008)
Find My Place (2012)
play the life (2016)
rebirth (2018)
continue (2019)
kingdom of the heavens (2019) 
spring has come (2022)

Awards, rankings and sales
Rankings, Continue was number 1 in Japan instrumental album sales in 2019.

Continue won the 34th golden disk award for “best instrumental album of the year” in 2019.

Charting albums/songs.

Spring has Come, Peak 13th/duration 4 weeks.

Continue, peak 13th/duration 4 weeks.

J's theme thanks 25th anniversary, peak 12th/duration 4 weeks.

Play the Life, peak 9th/duration 4 weeks.

Jaguar 13, peak 30th/duration 3 weeks.

Signature guitars

He is the first Asian guitarist to be added to the Fender signature artist club. He is one of the few people to receive multiple Fender signature guitars, having three unique signature designs in the line: the Michiya Haruhata Stratocaster(released in 2002), Michiya Haruhata BWL Stratocaster(released in 2005), and the Michiya Haruhata III Stratocaster(released in 2022).

Sports work
His song "J'S THEME" became the official theme song of the J.League, Japan's professional football (soccer) league. In 1993 he performed for 60,000 spectators live at the J-league opening ceremony at the national stadium.

His single "Kingdom of the Heavens" was made to be the theme song of the New Japan Pro-Wrestling tournament.

References

1966 births
Living people
Japanese rock guitarists
Tube (band) members
Being Inc. artists
People from Machida, Tokyo
20th-century Japanese guitarists
21st-century Japanese guitarists